The Hofstra Pride men's basketball team is the basketball team that represents Hofstra University in Hempstead, New York, United States. Hofstra played its first game in 1936, and currently competes in the Colonial Athletic Association.

Arenas 
The Hofstra Pride play their games at the David S. Mack Sports and Exhibition Complex. They have played many games at Madison Square Garden, winning the Holiday Festival in 1998, 1999, and 2006. Hofstra is 10–9 all-time at the Garden.

Hofstra has also played various games at Barclays Center and the Nassau Coliseum throughout its history.

Pride in the NBA
6 former Hofstra Pride players have played at least one game in the NBA.

Team records

Longest win streaks

Source: Hofstra Record Book

Notable Victories

|-
|- at Rutgers
| 2023 
| 88-86 (OT)

Single Game Records
Most points (game): 118 vs. Wagner (1971–72)
Most 3-pointers (game): 20 vs. James Madison (2019–20)

Single Season Records
Most points (season): 2,919 in 2018–19
Most 3-pointers (season): 308 in 2018–19

Rivalries 
Besides in-conference rivalries, Hofstra has a local rivalry with SUNY Stony Brook. Hofstra and Stony Brook are the only two NCAA Division I programs on Long Island outside of New York City (there are three universities with Division I programs in the New York City portion of Long Island: LIU and St. Francis in Brooklyn and St. John's in Queens). This rivalry is often referred to as the Battle of Long Island, in reference to the historical Battle of Long Island in 1776. Hofstra leads the rivalry 20–4 all time.

Postseason results

NCAA Division I Tournament results
The Pride have appeared in the NCAA Division I men's basketball tournament four times. Their combined record is 0–4.

The team earned their fifth appearance in the 2020 tournament, which was ultimately canceled due to the COVID-19 pandemic.

NCAA Division II Tournament results
The Pride have appeared in the NCAA Division II men's basketball tournament three times. Their combined record is 5–4.

NIT results
The Pride have appeared in the National Invitation Tournament (NIT) seven times. Their combined record is 3–7.

CBI results
The Pride have appeared in the College Basketball Invitational (CBI) three times. Their combined record is 0–3.

Players

Retired jerseys
Hofstra has retired five jerseys in program history. In 2011, Charles Jenkins became the first to have his retired while still active.

Statistical leaders

References

External links